Jiannis-Georgios Karl Smalios (also Ioannis-Georgios Smalios, ; born February 17, 1987, in Stockholm, Sweden) is a Swedish-born Greek javelin thrower. He won the gold medal for his category at the 2005 European Junior Championships in Kaunas, Lithuania, with a personal best throw of 77.25 metres. In 2010, Smalios improved his own record to 80.77 metres at the European Athletics Outdoor Classic Meeting in Kalamata. Few months later, he applied and granted a Swedish citizenship in order to compete internationally for his birth nation.

Smalios represented Greece at the 2008 Summer Olympics in Beijing, where he competed in the men's javelin throw. Smalios performed a best throw of 71.87 metres from his second attempt, but fell short in his bid for the twelve-man final as he placed twenty-seventh overall  in the qualifying rounds.

At the 2009 Mediterranean Games in Pescara, Italy, Smalios narrowly missed out of the medal in the same discipline by approximately two meters behind Slovenia's Matija Kranjc, attaining his seasonal best throw of 75.24 metres.

References

External links

NBC 2008 Olympics profile

1987 births
Living people
Greek male javelin throwers
Olympic athletes of Greece
Athletes (track and field) at the 2008 Summer Olympics
Athletes from Stockholm
Swedish people of Greek descent
Athletes (track and field) at the 2009 Mediterranean Games
Mediterranean Games competitors for Greece